Mettukulam Village is situated in the fort city of Vellore, India. The village lies between Vellore (10 km) and Chitoor (26 km) and the temple towns of Thiruvannamalai and Tirupati. Nearby are several colleges, ancient temples and the Christian Medical College and Hospital.

Maha Muthumariamman Temple 

The supreme Goddess is worshiped in this temple in the incarnation of Sri Mahamuthumariamman. The temple complex additionally houses shrines of Lord Mahaganapathy, Lord BalaMuruga and Navagrahas (9 Planets), all housed in independent sanctums.

Schools 
 Kingston College of Engineering
 St.Xavier's Higher Secondary School
 Sunbeam Matriculation Higher Secondary School
 Mettukulam R.T.O Checkpost

References

External links 
 Mettukulam, Vellore at Nativeplanet.com
 Mettukulam at Gloriousindia.com

Villages in Vellore district